Luis Chico Goerne (1892–1960) was a Mexican lawyer.

20th-century Mexican lawyers
1892 births
1960 deaths
Academic staff of the National Autonomous University of Mexico
People from Guanajuato